|}

The Long Walk Hurdle is a Grade 1 National Hunt hurdle race in Great Britain which is open to horses aged four years or older. It is run at Ascot over a distance of about 3 miles and 1 furlong (3 miles and 97 yards, or 5,029 metres), and during its running there are twelve hurdles to be jumped. The race is scheduled to take place each year in December.

The event is named after The Long Walk, an avenue of trees in Windsor Great Park. It was first run in 1965, and it was initially a handicap race. It became a conditions race in 1971, and it was given Grade 1 status in 1990. Prior to the redevelopment of Ascot Racecourse, which took place during the period 2004–06, the distance of the race was 3 miles and 1½ furlongs. 

Since 1971, six winners of the Long Walk Hurdle have gone on to win the World Hurdle in the same season – Derring Rose (1980–81), Baracouda (2001–02), My Way de Solzen (2005–06), Big Buck's (2009–10, 2010–11 and 2011–12), Thistlecrack (2015–16) and Paisley Park (2018-19).

Records
Most successful horse (4 wins):
 Baracouda – 2000, 2001, 2003, 2004

Leading jockey (4 wins):
 Richard Johnson – Anzum (1999), Mighty Man (2006), Reve di Sivola (2012, 2013)

Leading trainer (4 wins):
 François Doumen – Baracouda (2000, 2001, 2003, 2004)

Winners since 1971

See also
 Horse racing in Great Britain
 List of British National Hunt races

References
 Racing Post:
 , 

 pedigreequery.com – Long Walk Hurdle – Ascot.

External links
 Race Recordings 1986 – 2004 

National Hunt races in Great Britain
Ascot Racecourse
National Hunt hurdle races
Recurring sporting events established in 1965
1965 establishments in England